The Trascău Mountains are located in the Apuseni mountain range of the Western Romanian Carpathians, in Romania.

The Trascău Mountains are crossed by the picturesque Arieș River valley.

The middle sector continues to the Galda River, with peaks barely reaching 1,100 meters. The southern sector, which contains the Ciumerna Plateau (with an altitude of 1,200 meters) and the Dâmbău and Piatra Caprii peaks, ends at the Ampoi River.

Peaks
 Dâmbău, 1,369 m
 Piatra Caprii, 1,307 m
 Vârful Ugerului, 1,285 m
 Ardașcheia, 1,250 m
 Vârful Cornu, 1238 m
 Vârful Piatra Ceții, 1,233 m
 Măgulicea, 1,128 m
 Piatra Secuiului, 1,128 m
 Piatra Craivei, 1,078 m

Notes

See also
Turda Gorge
Râmeț and Cheile Râmețului, Cheile Mănăstirii
Tureni and Cheile Turului

Mountain ranges of Romania
Mountain ranges of the Western Romanian Carpathians
Western Romanian Carpathians